The Retaliators was the seventeenth novel in the Matt Helm secret agent novel series by Donald Hamilton. It was first published in 1976.  It was nominated for an Edgar Award in the paperback original category.

Plot summary
One of Helm's fellow operatives is killed by U.S. agents during an assassination run against a Mexican general. Helm finds himself having to complete the mission while being pursued by men who are supposed to be on his side.

References

1976 American novels
Matt Helm novels